Marco Hausjell (born 6 June 1999) is an Austrian professional footballer who plays as a right winger for 2. Liga club SV Horn.

Club career

Admira Wacker
Hausjell started his football career with 1. SC Felixdorf. In 2009, he joined the youth teams of Admira Wacker, where he later also played in the academy.

He made his debut for the Admira reserves on 27 September 2016, when he was in the starting eleven against the SKN St. Pölten reserves, before being replaced by Florian Fischerauer in the 75th minute.

After more than 15 games for the reserves, Hausjell made his first-team debut in the Austrian Bundesliga, starting in a 2–1 home victory against Rapid Wien on 11 February 2018, and scoring his first professional goal in the 69th minute of the game.

For the 2019–20 season, he moved on loan to 2. Liga club SV Horn. After the 2019–20 season, he initially did not return to Admira, as his contract had not been renewed. After Admira appointed a new sporting director in Franz Wohlfahrt, Hausjell's contract was extended in August 2020 and he signed a two-year contract. After his return, he made 20 Bundesliga appearances in the 2020–21 season, scoring once. In the 2021–22 season, he played eight times in the league before the winter break.

Würzburger Kickers
On 4 January 2022, Hausjell joined 3. Liga German club Würzburger Kickers. He made his debut for the club on 16 January, replacing Moritz Heinrich in the 89th minute of a 2–0 away loss to SC Verl. His first start for Würzburg came on 5 March 2022, playing 65 minutes before being substituted for Saliou Sané in a late 1–0 away win over Wehen Wiesbaden.

Hausjell made eight appearances for the club, as they suffered relegation to the Regionalliga Bayern at the end of the 2021–22 season.

Return to SV Horn
After six months, he returned to Austria where he signed for SV Horn on a two-year contract. He made his first appearance upon returning to the club on 15 July 2022, playing the first half of a 3–0 away win in the Austrian Cup over ASV Draßburg. Hausjell also appeared during the first match of Horn's 2022–23 2. Liga season, replacing Marcel Schelle at halftime in a 2–1 victory against Sturm Graz II.

References

External links
 

1999 births
Living people
Austrian footballers
Association football midfielders
Austria youth international footballers
FC Admira Wacker Mödling players
SV Horn players
Würzburger Kickers players
Austrian Football Bundesliga players
2. Liga (Austria) players
Austrian Regionalliga players
3. Liga players
Austrian expatriate footballers
Expatriate footballers in Germany
Austrian expatriate sportspeople in Germany
People from Wiener Neustadt-Land District
Footballers from Lower Austria